DC Comics Super Hero Adventures was a DC Comics themed area found at Six Flags New Orleans, in the Eastern New Orleans area of New Orleans, Louisiana, USA. It opened on April 12, 2003, after Six Flags took over the lease of the park in 2002 and added the company's signature Warner Bros. characters and themes.

History

In 2002, Six Flags took over the lease of Jazzland (which opened in 2000) and re-branded the park Six Flags New Orleans a year later. With the park's new ownership, Six Flags added the new themed section DC Comics Super Hero Adventures for 2003 season, themed after the DC Comics characters. Most of all the new attractions for the themed area were relocated from Thrill Valley, a theme park in Japan.

After Hurricane Katrina (2005-present)

When Hurricane Katrina hit the park on August 29, 2005, the park was severely flooded, causing the park to close down indefinitely. In 2007, Six Flags began the process of moving rides from the park to their other properties. Batman: The Ride was the first ride to leave the park, and was taken to Six Flags Fiesta Texas, where it was refurbished and reopened as Goliath on April 18, 2008. The park has been closed since 2005 and is no longer a Six Flags park, as it is now owned by the city of New Orleans. Despite Six Flags losing the park's lease to the city in 2009, all Looney Tunes and DC Comics theming stayed within the park itself.

Attractions

Rides
Catwoman's Whip (Mondial Shake)
Joker's Jukebox (Wieland Schwarzkopf Polyp)
Lex Luthor's Invertatron (Zamperla Windshear)

Theaters
Gotham City Hall

Former Attractions
Batman: The Ride (Bolliger & Mabillard inverted coaster) - Removed in 2007 and taken to Six Flags Fiesta Texas where it was refurbished and renamed Goliath. The ride reopened on April 18, 2008.

Gallery

References

Themed areas in Six Flags amusement parks
Six Flags attractions
Six Flags New Orleans
Amusement rides introduced in 2003
Amusement rides that closed in 2005
DC Comics in amusement parks
Batman in amusement parks
Superman in amusement parks